The 142nd Aviation Regiment is an aviation regiment of the United States Army. It is part of the 42nd Combat Aviation Brigade, 42nd Infantry Division.

Structure
 1st Battalion
 3d Battalion (Assault) 
 Iraq 2008-2009
Headquarters & Headquarters Company (NY ARNG), Ronkonkoma, New York
 Detachment 1 (NY ARNG), Ronkonkoma, New York
 Detachment 2 (ME ARNG), Aviation Support Facility, Bangor Armory, Bangor, Maine
 Company A (NY ARNG), Latham, New York)
 Company B (NY ARNG), Ronkonkoma, New York
 Company C (CT ARNG), Army Aviation Support Facility, Windsor Locks, Connecticut 
 Detachment 1 (ME ARNG), Aviation Support Facility, Bangor Armory, Bangor, Maine
 Company D (NY ARNG), Latham, New York 
 Detachment 1 (NY ARNG), Latham, New York
 Detachment 2 (ME ARNG), Aviation Support Facility, Bangor Armory, Bangor, Maine
 Company E (NY ARNG), Farmingdale, New York
 Detachment 2 (ME ARNG), Aviation Support Facility, Bangor Armory, Bangor, Maine
 Detachment 3 (NY ARNG), Latham, New York

References

External links
3 Battalion 142 Aviation, New York Army National Guard

142